Gouyave Football Club is a Grenadian football club based in Gouyave. The club was founded in 2008, and spent most of its history in the lower leagues of Grenada. During the 2016 GFA Premier Division season, Gouyave played, for the first time in their history, in the top flight of Grenadian football.

Known players 
 Kacey Smith
 Nakim Straker
 Jamal Charles

References 

Gouyave